Chilmington Green was a hamlet on the edge of the Kentish Weald comprising 10 listed buildings. It is south-west of the town of Ashford. The population at the 2011 Census was included in the civil parish of Great Chart with Singleton.

In 2014, Ashford Borough Council approved plans for a new town of up to 5,750 houses plus a countryside park, a secondary school, four primary schools, a supermarket and a new high street and market square on 1,000 acres of agricultural land around the hamlet.

Chilmington Green is now part of the new South of Ashford Garden Community in Ashford, Kent. The development will create a thriving community in the heart of Kent and include a total 5,750 high-quality homes, set to be built over the next 20 years. Properties will adhere to the latest energy efficiency standards to create a sustainable living environment. 

The development will also include its own high street, with a range of shops as well as community infrastructure, commercial space and plenty of open space to enjoy the beautiful Kentish countryside.

The project will support 1,000 new jobs in the borough over the next 20 years.

Amenities
As a new garden community, Chilmington Green will include £125m worth of new facilities:

Four primary schools, with the first one already open to students off site and opened at Chilmington Green in 2021.

One secondary school, which will serve the Chilmington and wider Ashford community.

A dedicated high street, with shops, restaurants and a new supermarket.

Healthcare facilities.

Sports and leisure infrastructure.

A 300-acre country park with sports pitches and event facilities.

These will aim to create a safe and friendly environment for families and people of all ages.

For more information on the scheme please visit: 
https://www.southofashfordgc.com/
https://www.ashford.gov.uk/planning-and-development/major-developments/south-of-ashford-garden-community/

References

Villages in Kent
Borough of Ashford